In November 1994, the Turkish military launched a winter campaign in South-Eastern Turkey to cut rebels from the Kurdistan Workers' Party (PKK), who were active in the region, off from their winter supplies. The campaign continued until  March 20, 1995, when the Turkish government launched an offensive into Iraqi Kurdistan to dislodge the PKK from its bases before the spring. According to Turkish sources, 110 Kurdish rebels, 16 members of Turkish security forces and 14 civilians were killed in November, 148 Kurdish rebels, six members of Turkish security forces and three civilians were killed in December, 107 Kurdish rebels and 14 civilians were killed in January, 128 Kurdish rebels, 34 members of Turkish security forces and seven civilians were killed in February and 88 Kurdish rebels and 25 Kurdish rebels were killed in March prior to Operation Steel.

See also
Operation Steel

References

History of the Kurdistan Workers' Party
1995 in Turkey
1995 in Iraq
Conflicts in 1995
Cross-border operations of Turkey into Iraq

tr:Çelik Harekâtı
vi:Chiến dịch Thép